Wattisham Strict Baptist Chapel is a Strict Baptist chapel in the village of Wattisham in Suffolk, England. It was built in 1825 and has been a Grade II listed building since 1980.

History
The congregation was founded in 1763. Its first purpose-built chapel on this site was completed in the 1780s. It was replaced with the current brick building in 1825.

See also
 List of Strict Baptist churches

References

Further reading

External links

19th-century churches in the United Kingdom
Chapels in England
Churches completed in 1825
Churches in Suffolk
Baptist churches in England
Grade II listed churches in Suffolk
Religious organizations established in 1763
Strict Baptist chapels
Babergh District